The Monastery of Saint Archangel Gabriel, also known as the Zemun monastery is a Serbian Orthodox monastery. Its church was built in 1786, on the site of an older church in the Donji Grad neighbourhood of Zemun (today part of Belgrade, Serbia). The monastery was officially established in 1990.

History
The founder was Teodor–Toša Apostolović, the president of the Zemun ecclesiastical province. After the dismantling of the quarantine zone (kontumac) in 1842, the church lost its importance and by the second half of the 20th century, it was abandoned. In 1981, the abandoned church was used by then jeromonah (present Bishop) Filaret. On his behalf, the church was renovated, as the frescoes were destroyed and the church was used as a weapon cache. In 1990, protosinđel Filaret gained a permit to build a temple (cathedral) of 3,000 m2 on the site of the church, however, the following year, newly elected Serbian Patriarch Pavle declined.

See also
List of Serb Orthodox monasteries

References

External links
Monasteries in Belgrade
About the monastery (in Serbian)
About the monastery (in Serbian)

Serbian Orthodox monasteries in Belgrade
18th-century Serbian Orthodox church buildings
Churches completed in 1786
Zemun
Syrmia